Sandra Cacic was the defending champion but lost in the quarterfinals to Tamarine Tanasugarn.

Marion Maruska won in the final 6–3, 6–1 against Judith Wiesner.

Seeds
A champion seed is indicated in bold text while text in italics indicates the round in which that seed was eliminated.

  Anke Huber (quarterfinals)
  Judith Wiesner (final)
  Linda Wild (second round)
  Barbara Schett (first round)
  Florencia Labat (second round)
  Dominique Van Roost (first round)
  Karin Kschwendt (first round)
  Alexandra Fusai (first round)

Draw

External links
 ITF tournament edition details

WTA Auckland Open
1997 WTA Tour